The Sociological Research Association is an honor society of sociological scholars founded in 1936. 

With more than 400 members, the association's importance comes from the members being leading sociologists who use the SRA's meetings to network and exchange views on the direction of the field. The great majority of members are American and Canadian, in large part because the association's annual meeting, lecture, and induction of new members takes place at its annual banquet during an evening of the American Sociological Association's annual meeting. 

Although there have been no contentious issues since the 1970s, at times the SRA has served as an alternative to the mainstream of American sociology. It was founded in the 1930s in opposition to the dominant Chicago school of sociology. And in the late 1960s, it was seen by some as a counterweight to the radical and anti-empirical activity of some leading sociologists.

Each year, a membership committee selects up to 14 members on the basis of merit. A new member of the SRA's five-person executive committee is elected annually by the members, rising through the leadership ranks to become the president of the society.

References 
Robert C. Banister (1991). Sociology and Scientism: The American Quest for Objectivity, 1880-1940. Chapel Hill: University of North Carolina Press, 1991.
"Current Items" (1936). American Sociological Review, 1(4): 650-651
[Statement by American Sociological Review Editorial Board about the new Sociological Research Association.] (December 1936)." Editorial Notes." American Sociological Review, 1(6): 967-968.
Patricia Madoo Lengermann (1979). "The Founding of the Sociological Review: The Anatomy of a Rebellion." American Sociological Review, 44(2): 185-198.

Sociological organizations
Organizations established in 1936